Bressana Bottarone is a comune (municipality) in the Province of Pavia in the Italian region Lombardy, located about 45 km south of Milan and about 11 km south of Pavia.

References

External links
 Official website

Cities and towns in Lombardy